Clube Desportivo Instituto D. João V is a former futsal team from Pombal, Portugal created by the Instituto D. João V school. They played in the Liga Portuguesa de Futsal but dissolved in 2011 due to lack of sponsors.

Honours
National
Taça de Portugal de Futsal:
Winner (1): 1998–99
Runner-up (1): 2000–01
SuperTaça de Futsal de Portugal:
Winner (1): 1999

Former players
  Fábio Aguiar (2009–11)
 Nuno Dias (1997–2003)
 Dani Fernandes (1997–98)
 Pedro Ferreira (1999–2001)
 Nuno Neves (2000–01)
 Arnaldo Pereira (1999–2001)
 Ruizinho (2000–02 and 2007–11)
 André Sousa (2007–11)

References

Futsal clubs in Portugal
Futsal clubs established in 1992
Sports clubs disestablished in 2011
1992 establishments in Portugal
2011 disestablishments in Portugal